The white-throated barbtail (Premnoplex tatei) is a species of bird in the family Furnariidae. It is endemic to Venezuela.

Its natural habitat is subtropical or tropical moist montane forest. It is threatened by habitat loss.

References

External links
BirdLife Species Factsheet.
White-throated barbtail videos on the Internet Bird Collection

white-throated barbtail
Birds of the Venezuelan Coastal Range
Endemic birds of Venezuela
white-throated barbtail
Taxonomy articles created by Polbot